Simon Ernest Royce (born 9 September 1971) is an English football coach and former professional footballer who is goalkeeping coach at Leyton Orient. 

As a player he was a goalkeeper who played in the Premier League for Charlton Athletic and Leicester City, although he spent the rest of his career in the Football League with notable spells at Southend United, Queens Park Rangers and Gillingham. He also played for Brighton & Hove Albion, Manchester City and Luton Town. Since taking up coaching he has been registered as a back-up player for both Brentford and back with Gillingham.

Playing career
Royce began his career with non-League Heybridge Swifts and after claiming the number one jersey off long standing Albie Bridge while still a teenager soon attracted the interest of many Football League sides. He joined Southend United for a £35,000 fee in October 1991 and became the first Heybridge player to be sold to a professional club. He spent a few seasons as understudy to Paul Sansome before finally establishing himself as the Shrimpers' first choice and a fans' favourite – he played in the successful Southend side in the mid 1990s under Barry Fry and later Peter Taylor before Charlton Athletic manager Alan Curbishley snapped him up on a free transfer. Despite some strong performances in the Premier League, including many clean sheets resulting in setting a post-war club record, injury prevented Royce from establishing himself as regularly as he would have liked and, after the arrival of Dean Kiely, he rejoined former boss Peter Taylor at Leicester City. Some good early form resulted with speculation about an England call-up for new manager Sven-Goran Eriksson's initial squad, however this never materialised and further injuries prevented Royce from making as many first team appearances as he possibly could.

A second spell at Charlton followed before he moved into the lower tiers of the Football League with Queens Park Rangers, Manchester City (on loan), Luton Town (on loan) and Brighton & Hove Albion (on loan) again teaming up with Peter Taylor. During a Stoke City vs QPR game, he was attacked by a Stoke fan.

Royce joined Gillingham in April 2007 as an emergency loan signing after the Kent team were left with no fit goalkeepers for their final three matches of the season, making his debut for Gillingham in the 3–2 home win over Port Vale on 21 April 2007. In August 2007 he joined Gillingham on a free transfer, saying that he intended to see out the rest of his career at Gillingham and his performances in goal won him the Supporters' Player of the Year award for the 2007–08 season. He was first choice goalkeeper at Gillingham again in the promotion season of 2008–09 and at the beginning of the following season. He was forced out of the team by injuries sustained in a car accident in December 2009 and never regained his place from Alan Julian.

Coaching career
His Gillingham contract expired at the end of that season and although he had been offered a goalkeeper/coach role at Gillingham, he opted in June 2010 to take up the role at Brentford, where he remained until the end of the 2017–18 season.

He returned to Gillingham as a goalkeeping coach in June 2019 and was listed on the bench against Oxford United due to an injury to second-choice keeper Joe Walsh. He is also one of the oldest players to appear in a football video game as an active footballer when he appeared in FIFA 20, making his first appearance in the series since FIFA 11. The Kent side announced in June 2020 that Royce would be released when his contract expired the following month.  In 2021 Royce joined Leyton Orient as goalkeeping coach under Kenny Jackett.

Career statistics

Honours
Gillingham

Football League Two play-offs: 2009

Individual

Gillingham Player of the Season: 2007–08
Southend United Player of the Season: 1995–96

References

External links

Simon Royce at premierleague.com

1971 births
Living people
Footballers from Forest Gate
English footballers
Association football goalkeepers
Heybridge Swifts F.C. players
Southend United F.C. players
Charlton Athletic F.C. players
Leicester City F.C. players
Luton Town F.C. players
Brighton & Hove Albion F.C. players
Manchester City F.C. players
Queens Park Rangers F.C. players
Gillingham F.C. players
Brentford F.C. players
English Football League players
Premier League players
Brentford F.C. non-playing staff
Gillingham F.C. non-playing staff
Leyton Orient F.C. non-playing staff
Association football goalkeeping coaches